Witherbee Memorial Hall is a historic workingmen's club building located at Mineville in Essex County, New York.  It was built in 1893 by the Witherbee, Sherman & Co. mining company.  It is a massive Shingle Style structure.  It is a "T" shaped wood-frame structure with a long, rectangular, gable fronted main block.  The front elevation features a prominent, recessed second story balcony highlighted by paired Doric order columns. It is now owned and operated by Mineville VFW Post 5802. It also houses a six lane bowling center. 

It was listed on the National Register of Historic Places in 1991.

Gallery

References

Clubhouses on the National Register of Historic Places in New York (state)
Shingle Style architecture in New York (state)
Cultural infrastructure completed in 1893
Buildings and structures in Essex County, New York
National Register of Historic Places in Essex County, New York